Lavalle, LaValle or La Valle may refer to:

Places

Argentina
 Lavalle, Corrientes, capital of Lavalle Department, Corrientes
Lavalle, Santiago del Estero, a municipality and village 
 General Lavalle, a town 
General Lavalle Partido in Buenos Aires Province
 Lavalle (Buenos Aires Metro), a metro station 
 Lavalle Department, Corrientes 
 Lavalle Department, Mendoza 
 Fortín Lavalle, a village and municipality

Italy
 La Val (Italian: La Valle), a comune in the province of South Tyrol

United States
LaValle, Missouri, an unincorporated community
La Valle, Wisconsin, a village
La Valle (town), Wisconsin, the town where the village of La Valle is located
 Lavalle House, a historic home in Florida
Kenneth P. LaValle Stadium in Stony Brook, New York

Other uses
Marina Lavalle, a 1965 Mexican telenovela
Lavalle (surname)